Death's Marathon is a 1913 silent film short directed by D. W. Griffith and distributed by Biograph. It stars Blanche Sweet and Henry B. Walthall and was filmed in the Los Angeles area. This film survives and is available on DVD.

Cast
Blanche Sweet - The Wife
Henry B. Walthall - The Husband
Walter Miller - The Friend, The Husband's Partner
Lionel Barrymore - The Financial Backer
Kate Bruce - The Nanny
Robert Harron - The Messenger

uncredited
William J. Butler - Man at Club
Harry Hyde - A Fried at Club
J. Jiquel Lanoe - Man at Club
Adolph Lestina - Man at Club
Charles Hill Mailes - 
Alfred Paget - A Gambler at Club
W. C. Robinson - Man at Club

References

External links
Death's Marathon at IMDb.com
 Death's Marathon on YouTube
allrovi.com; synopsis
available for free download (archive.org)

1913 films
American silent short films
American black-and-white films
Biograph Company films
Films directed by D. W. Griffith
1913 romantic drama films
American romantic drama films
1913 short films
1910s American films
Silent romantic drama films
Silent American drama films